Jidali fort was a cross-shaped fort of the Dervish era located in the town of Jidali in Sanaag, Somaliland and is also the first place in Africa to be bombed via aerial bombardment by a tally of four sorties of De Havilland DH-9's on 21 January 1920. An April 1920 letter between the Sayid and Italian-Somali governor Giacomo De Martino states that the Dervishes built a total of twenty-seven forts which are described as Dhulbahante garesas. 

According to Lieutenant-Colonel H. Moyse-Bartlett, the Jidali fort was primary means used to conduct Darawiish raids against the possessions of Italian Somaliland and British Somaliland:

Mouse-Bartlett also stated that the Jidali fort was a central or nucleus fort which itself was surrounded by five satellite forts:

Dervish description

The description by Muhammad Abdullah Hassan, emir of Diiriye Guure, on these forts after the fall of Taleh in February 1920, in an April 1920 letter transcribed from the original Arabic script into Italian by the incumbent Governatori della Somalia, the various Darawiish-built installations are described as garesas taken from the Dhulbahante by the British:

Although the endonymic term for Darawiish built installations are Dhulbahante garesas, colonial sources refer to Dhulbahante garesas as Dervish forts.

Significance
According to Dervish veteran Aw Cabdulle Ibraahiim, the headquarters of the Dervish was shortly changed from Taleh to Jidali in the year 1919:

Colonial sources also acknowledge that the fort at Jidali was the second most significant Darawiish fort besides the Taleh fort, with Douglas Jardine describing Jidali fort as oen of two main Darawiis positions:

Yusuf Agararan
The most significant raid carried out by the garrison at Jidali was the raid led by Yusuf Agararan in 1917. The term Agararan in the Somali language literally means "feetless"; Agararan was the most senior Darawiish commander in the Jidali area. 

Douglas Jardine, a colonial administrator in the area, described the raid by Yusuf Agararan which stemmed from Jidali in the following way:

First operation since WW1
The assault on the Jidali fort and its five satellite forts was the first British combined air, ground and sea assault on a target in Africa:

There were six bombers sent for sorties, an event Roy Irons described as "Four of the aircraft failed to find Medishe, but bombed the fort at Jid Ali and attacked livestock in the surrounding country." Taleh had the highest number of sorties aimed towards it with the entire fleet of air sent to air-bomb it, whilst Jidali accumulated the second highest tally of sorties bombing it at four. The air-bombing campaign lasted a month and the squadron bases from where the Jidali bombings were launched was Eil Dur Elan, whilst the bases from where the Taleh airstrikes were launched was Ceel-Afweyn, both in western Sanaag. 

Afqarshe Ismail

According to native Darawiish accounts, the first airstrike in Africa was struck at a field between Medishe and Jidali wherein men gathered to watch the display of aerobatics. The reports claim that Afqarshe Ismail, the former spokesperson for Darawiish, was the first person to be killed in an airstrike in Africa:

Satellite forts
Although Jidali was the main Dhulbahante garesa in the north, the Jidali fortification had five satellite forts which surrounded Jidali; these included, Baran, Medishe, the Surud Hills, Ershida, and Galbaribur. Examples of satellite Dhulbahante garesa's of Jidali include the following:

Aftermath
In his poem diidda ama yeella'', Aadan Carab, a Somali poet mentions on the incident stating "markaan dumiyey calankaan dejiyo dawladnimadayda, waa waxay dadku u leeyihiin dabo-xiddhki meeyey?" Writer Idaaja interprets this message as stating that the aerial bombardment campaign was emblematic of a Dhulbahante genocide orchestrated by the European colonialists:

A 1931 diary-book by former Italian Somalia governor Francesco Caroselli says that in a letter exchanged in April 1920 between the Sayid and Italian-Somali governor Giacomo De Martino, the Sayid describes the Dervish forts as Dervish forts.

Gallery

References

Archaeological sites in Somalia